Darreh Bayan (also Romanized as Darreh Bayān, and Darreh Beyān; also known as Darbīān and Darbiyān) is a village in Shamshir Rural District, in the Central District of Paveh County, Kermanshah Province, Iran. At the 2006 census, its population was 639, in 141 families.

References 

Populated places in Paveh County